A jiao, or mao (Cantonese: hou []), is a unit of currency used in Greater China, including the People's Republic of China (Mainland China), the Republic of China (Taiwan), Hong Kong and Macao.

 The Renminbi has coins of 1, 2 and 5 jiao.
 The New Taiwan dollar has coins of 5 jiao (rarely used).
 The Hong Kong dollar has coins of 1, 2 and 5 hou (known as 10, 20 and 50 cents).
 The Macanese pataca has coins of 1, 2 and 5 hou (known as 10, 20 and 50 avos).

Gallery

See also
 Fen (currency)
 Chinese yuan

References

Currencies of China